was a town located in Kagawa District, Kagawa Prefecture, Japan.

As of 2003, the town had an estimated population of 3,583 and a density of 44.73 persons per km². The total area was 80.10 km².

On September 26, 2005, Shionoe was merged into the expanded city of Takamatsu and no longer exists as an independent municipality.

Every June, Shionoe hosts a firefly festival to celebrate the arrival of the luminous insect which is found in the area.

References

External links
 Takamatsu official website 

Dissolved municipalities of Kagawa Prefecture
Takamatsu, Kagawa